Osisko Lake (officially Lac Osisko) is a lake in Rouyn-Noranda, Quebec, Canada. It is 3 km (2 mi) long, and 3 km wide. The downtown of Rouyn-Noranda is situated on its western shore. The lake is a recreational area, surrounded by trails and a bike path. The city hospital is also located on the lake's shore. Lac Osisko has been a polluted lake for decades, having been contaminated by tailings from Noranda Mines.

Etymology

Osisko comes from Algonquin and means "muskrat".

References

Rouyn-Noranda
Lakes of Abitibi-Témiscamingue